Joël Omari Tshibamba (born 22 September 1988) is a Dutch-Congolese professional footballer who plays as a forward for Dutch club Achilles '29.

Club career

NEC 
Tshibamba played for NEC's youth team before making his senior debut for the club in a 2007–08 Eredivisie playoff-match against FC Groningen. For the 2009–10 season, he was sent on loan at the affiliate club FC Oss.

On 1 December 2009, Tshibamba was sent back to NEC, after it had come clear that he had been struggling with disciplinary problems.

Arka Gdynia 
On 5 January 2010, Tshibamba was given a free transfer by NEC, and about a month later he signed with Arka Gdynia of the Polish Ekstraklasa.
Tshibamba started his Polish adventure well by scoring two times in the first four matches. He helped Arka to win that season against both Cracovia and Wisła Kraków.

Lech Poznań 
On 17 July 2010, Tshibamba signed a contract with the current Polish champions, Lech Poznań. He made his debut for Lech Poznań in the club's 1–0 away loss at Sparta Prague in the 2010–11 UEFA Champions League third qualifying round. In October 2010, he scored his first goal for the club in a 3–1 away loss to Manchester City in the 2010–11 UEFA Europa League.

AEL 
On 16 January 2011, he scored his first goal with the Greek side, in a 2–1 home victory against Iraklis. On 15 June, after a good season with Larissa, he signed a 4-year contract. Although he had shown signs of disciplinary misconduct, the fans attributed that to him needing time to adapt to his new city. He scored his first goal in the 2011–12 campaign in an impressive away 3–0 win against Veria F.C. On 18 December 2011, Tshibamba scored a hat-trick against Anagennisi Epanomi in a 5–2 win. He scored two more goals against Anagennisi Giannitswn. On 23 February 2012, he was given on loan to Krylia Sovetov till the end of the season. In September 2012 Tshibamba returned to AEL 1964 FC. In December 2012, he took permission for absence over Christmas but refused to return. He later claimed that he took this decision due to financial issues about his contract.

Henan Jianye 
On 25 February 2013, Tshibamba was signed by China League One side Henan Jianye.

FC Vestsjælland 
On 13 August 2013 Tshibamba signed a two-year deal with the Danish Superliga side FC Vestsjælland.

AEL 
On 15 July 2015, Tshibamba returned and signed a two-year deal with the Greek Football League side AE Larissa FC. Despite that, he never made an official appearance with the club and solve his contract on 24 August 2015.

Botev Plovdiv 
After a short trial Tshibamba signed a contract with Botev Plovdiv on 11 September 2015. On 18 January 2016 Tshibamba was released from Botev Plovdiv after playing in seven games without scoring any goals.

Koper 
In June 2016 he signed for FC Koper in Slovenia. He received a red card in his first official match against Rudar Velenje on  30 July 2016 after just two minutes of playing, and his contract was terminated after the match.

Doğan Türk Birliği
After a short period at Dutch amateur club DVE-Trajanus, Tshibamba joined Cypriot club Doğan Türk Birliği on 23 January 2017.

Warriors FC 
Tshibamba signed for S.League side Warriors FC in March 2017, filling the club's final foreign signing slot. He signed for the club after the club scouted him using the online footballing database application, InStat, and invited him to Singapore. Tshibamba signed after being convinced that the club would be challenging for silverwares, something that Tshibamba has not been able to achieve with his past eleven clubs.

He made his debut for the Warriors in a 1–1 draw against Geylang International in match day 2 of the S.League season. Tshibamba almost scored on his debut as his header came off the post in the 35th minute. He got his first goals for the club on 8 April 2017 in a 4–3 win over Garena Young Lions, scoring a brace to help his club claw back from 3–1 down in the last ten minutes.

He was released at the mid-season transfer window due to poor performances.

VW Hamme
On 16 November 2018, Tshibamba joined Belgian club VW Hamme. After less than two months, he left the club.

Nocerina
On 29 July 2019, it was announced, that Tshibamba had joined Italian Serie D club A.S.D. Nocerina 1910. In September 2019, during an away game against AC Nardò, Tshibamba became the target of racist chants by supporters of the home club. Nardò received an official warning and a fine of €1000 from the Italian Football Federation.

After having played four games, the club announced on 18 October 2019, that the players' contract had been terminated for disciplinary reasons.

References

External links
 

1988 births
Living people
Footballers from Kinshasa
Dutch footballers
Dutch expatriate footballers
Association football forwards
NEC Nijmegen players
Arka Gdynia players
Lech Poznań players
Athlitiki Enosi Larissa F.C. players
PFC Krylia Sovetov Samara players
Henan Songshan Longmen F.C. players
China League One players
FC Vestsjælland players
Botev Plovdiv players
FC Koper players
Warriors FC players
A.S.D. Nocerina 1910 players
Achilles '29 players
Eredivisie players
Slovenian PrvaLiga players
Eerste Divisie players
Ekstraklasa players
Super League Greece players
Russian Premier League players
Danish Superliga players
First Professional Football League (Bulgaria) players
Serie D players
Dutch expatriate sportspeople in Poland
Dutch expatriate sportspeople in Greece
Dutch expatriate sportspeople in Russia
Dutch expatriate sportspeople in China
Dutch expatriate sportspeople in Denmark
Dutch expatriate sportspeople in Bulgaria
Dutch expatriate sportspeople in Slovenia
Dutch expatriate sportspeople in Singapore
Dutch expatriate sportspeople in Belgium
Dutch expatriate sportspeople in Cyprus
Dutch expatriate sportspeople in Italy
Expatriate footballers in Poland
Expatriate footballers in Greece
Expatriate footballers in Russia
Expatriate footballers in China
Expatriate men's footballers in Denmark
Expatriate footballers in Bulgaria
Expatriate footballers in Armenia
Expatriate footballers in Slovenia
Expatriate footballers in Singapore
Expatriate footballers in Belgium
Expatriate footballers in Cyprus
Expatriate footballers in Italy
Democratic Republic of the Congo emigrants to the Netherlands
Dutch people of Democratic Republic of the Congo descent
Quick 1888 players